The 1955–56 NBA season was the Nationals' 7th season in the NBA.

Regular season

Season standings

x – clinched playoff spot

Record vs. opponents

Game log

Playoffs

|- align="center" bgcolor="#ccffcc" 
| 1
| March 17
| New York
| W 82–77
| Dolph Schayes (14)
| Dolph Schayes (14)
| Seymour, King (6)
| Onondaga War Memorial
| 1–0
|-

|- align="center" bgcolor="#ffcccc" 
| 1
| March 17
| @ Boston
| L 93–110
| Ed Conlin (21)
| —
| Dolph Schayes (6)
| Boston Garden
| 0–1
|- align="center" bgcolor="#ccffcc" 
| 2
| March 19
| Boston
| W 101–98
| Red Kerr (23)
| Red Kerr (14)
| Seymour, Schayes (5)
| Onondaga War Memorial
| 1–1
|- align="center" bgcolor="#ccffcc" 
| 3
| March 21
| @ Boston
| W 102–97
| Dolph Schayes (27)
| Dolph Schayes (17)
| Dolph Schayes (5)
| Boston Garden
| 2–1
|-

|- align="center" bgcolor="#ffcccc" 
| 1
| March 23
| @ Philadelphia
| L 87–109
| Dolph Schayes (19)
| Kerr, Schayes (14)
| George King (8)
| Philadelphia Civic Center
| 0–1
|- align="center" bgcolor="#ccffcc" 
| 2
| March 25
| Philadelphia
| W 118–112
| Dolph Schayes (33)
| Dolph Schayes (16)
| George King (10)
| Onondaga War Memorial
| 1–1
|- align="center" bgcolor="#ffcccc" 
| 3
| March 27
| @ Philadelphia
| L 96–119
| Ed Conlin (19)
| Dolph Schayes (21)
| George King (6)
| Philadelphia Civic Center
| 1–2
|- align="center" bgcolor="#ccffcc" 
| 4
| March 28
| Philadelphia
| W 108–104
| George King (25)
| Red Kerr (9)
| George King (15)
| Onondaga War Memorial
| 2–2
|- align="center" bgcolor="#ffcccc" 
| 5
| March 29
| @ Philadelphia
| L 104–109
| Dolph Schayes (28)
| Dolph Schayes (16)
| George King (13)
| Philadelphia Civic Center
| 2–3
|-

Awards and records
Dolph Schayes, All-NBA Second Team

References

Philadelphia 76ers seasons
Syracuse